Gautam Chattopadhyay (1 June 1949 – 20 June 1999) was an Indian Bengali singer, songwriter, bassist, and composer. In 1975, as a leader he founded the progressive rock band Moheener Ghoraguli with Tapas Das,  Abraham Mazumdar, Pradip Chatterjee,  Ranjon Ghoshal, Biswanath Bishu Chattopadhyay  Tapesh Bandopadhyay. He was also a theatre personality, filmmaker, and ethnographer.

He played many Indian and Western instruments. During his college years he played lead guitar in a band called The Urge, whose members were mostly Anglo Indians, in pubs including Trincas and Moulin Rouge at Park Street of Kolkata during the 1960s.

While a student at the Presidency College in Kolkata, he participated in the political movement of the late 60s and early 70s in Bengali campuses known as the Naxal Movement. He then moved to Jabalpur, working for about a year as a Medical representative in Jabalpur and then in Bhopal. He continued composing music  during this phase of his life.

Chattopadhyay returned to Kolkata, and formed a band called Saptarshi with his brothers Pradip Chattopadhyay, Biswanath (or Bishu) Chattopadhyay, first cousin Ranjon Ghoshal, Biswanath's friend Abraham Mazumder, and family friends Tapesh Bandopadhyay and Tapash Das. Later they called themselves Moheener Ghoraguli. He worked with the 'Bauls'Fakirs, creating a new genre of music, 'baul-jazz'. Chattopadhyay introduced new lyrics and the guitar, saxophone and drum set.

Moheener Ghoraguli was not commercially successful at the time, and the band disintegrated in 1981. During the mid-nineties, Chattopadhyay revived Mohiner Ghoraguli by releasing the albums Abar bachhor kuri pore (1995), Jhara shomoyer gaan (1996), Maya (1997), and Khepar gaan (1998). He included new singers and his own compositions, as well as songs composed by others.

Later, Chattopadhyay continued a solo career, composing new songs, composing music for his own films and working as music director for other film-makers. The feature films directed by him include Nagmoti (which won the President's Medal at the National Film Awards in 1983). His second feature film was  Somoy (which was never released) A Letter to Mom, an English film on the life of the Anglo Indian community.

His first documentary was about the dhakis (drummers) of Bengal called The Primal Call. After that he made several documentaries, including 'The Dinosaurs, The sun temple of konarak to The Naya theatre and Habib Tanvir. He made a short film for American community television program To Love is to Paint...

Chattopadhyay was invited to Karbi-Anglong in the mid-nineties to work  with the Karbi people and to preserve their  folk lores and folk music, which they felt was being influenced by  film music.
Gautam did not believe in just saving their music by making notations and keeping it in an archive, instead, he started teaching the young people to read notations, to play and sing the songs and during this period he came up with the idea of doing an opera with them. He did the opera on their folklore called Hai-mu. About 300 Karbi youth performed in this opera which was a grand success. The Karbis fell in love with Gautam.
Gautam then began to make a film in Karbi language, which remained incomplete due to his sudden death in 1999.

Discography

Shangbigno Pakhikul O Kolkata Bishayak (1977)
Ajaana UDonto bostu ba Aw-Oo-Baw (1978)
Drishyomaan Moheener Ghoraguli (1979)

Filmography

As director
1'Nagmoti National award in(1983).
2, Shomoy
3, Letter to Mom
4, Rongbin(karbi)

As music directorKichhhu Sanlap Kichhu Pralap (1999)Nagmoti (1983)Bhalobasa O Andhakar'' (1982)
  Shomoy
   Rongbin

Awards and nominations

References

External links

Moheener Ghoraguli homepage

1948 births
1999 deaths
20th-century Indian musicians
20th-century guitarists
Experimental musicians
Indian male singer-songwriters
Indian singer-songwriters
Bengali singers
Bengali musicians
Indian socialists
Indian rock guitarists
Rhythm guitarists
Indian atheists
Moheener Ghoraguli members
University of Calcutta alumni
People from West Bengal
People from Karbi Anglong district
20th-century Indian male singers
20th-century Indian singers
Musicians from West Bengal